The Bangalore City Traffic Police, generally known as BTP, is a specialized unit of the Bangalore City Police responsible for overseeing and enforcing traffic safety compliance on city roads as well as managing the flow of traffic in the city of Bangalore, Karnataka.

As of October 2014, the BTP employed 2684 full-time personnel. This included 1309 Police Constables (PCs), 825 Head Constables (HCs), 303 Assistant Sub-Inspectors (ASIs), 191 Police Sub-Inspectors (PSIs) 45 Police Inspectors (PIs). This number excludes 9 Assistant Commissioners of Police (ACPs), 2 Deputy Commissioners of Police (DCPs), and 1 Additional Commissioner of Police, Traffic (Addl.C.P)

The Commissioner of Police is the overall operational leader of the force, but the Force is normally managed by the Additional
Commissioner of Police on behalf of the Commissioner.

A few informal names and abbreviations exist for the Bangalore Traffic Police, the most common being the BTP. Within the city,
it is simply known as the Traffic Police.

The BTP's headquarters is located at #05, Infantry road, near Indian Express building.

History

Although the City Police system was successfully established a century ago, a traffic wing became necessary in 1930. Then Inspector General Hamilton is responsible for the formation of Traffic Police Wing in Bangalore. The first Headquarters was at Halasur Gate Outer Station with a sanctioned strength of 2 European Constables, 7 Duffedars, 2 Constables, 12 Writers, and 37 duty officers.

Gallery

See also 
 Bangalore City Police
Bangalore Metropolitan Transport Corporation
Bruhat Bangalore Mahanagara Palike
Infrastructure in Bangalore

References

External links 
 Official Website of Bangalore City Traffic Police
 Bangalore Traffic Information System
 Official Fabebook Page

Bangalore Urban district
Transport in Bangalore
Karnataka Police
Specialist law enforcement agencies of India
1930 establishments in British India
Government agencies established in 1930